Kroksbäcksparken is a neighbourhood and park in Malmö, Sweden. It covers an area of 26 hectares.

References

Neighbourhoods of Malmö
Parks in Malmö